Ambrose Olsen  (November 27, 1985 – April 22, 2010) was an American male fashion model. He was known for appearing in dozens of ad campaigns for Armani and Hugo Boss.

Early life 

Ambrose Olsen (sometimes also written as Olson) was born in Homer, Alaska. Prior to modeling, he studied to be a carpenter. He also practiced surfing, boxing, and hockey as sports and planned to volunteer for the US Navy. He began modeling at the age of 17, moving to New York City in 2002.

Modeling
Olsen appeared in many print ads and a few runway shows and a few fashion videos. At time of death he was represented by the Click Management modeling agency. He was best known for his 2007 Armani Exchange ads with Adriana Lima. He also worked for numerous other brands such as TNT, Hugo Boss, D&G, Nautica, Yves Saint Laurent, Dior, Louis Vuitton, Burberry, Giorgio Armani Extreme Attitude among others. He also did the catwalk on shows by Alexandre Herchcovitch and Kim Jones among others.

Major advertising campaigns
2003: Hugo Boss ad campaign with Raquel Zimmermann
2005: D&G on request of Steven Klein
2006: Nautica print ads
2006: Dior Homme skin care
2007: Armani Exchange
2009: Extreme Attitude fragrance by Giorgio Armani (contract)

Major magazine appearances
2003: VMAN magazine photographed and videotaped by Hedi Slimane
January 2005: On cover of Têtu
Sept 2005: On cover of Wonderland with Solange Wilvert and Sessilee Lopez
Spring-Summer 2007: Numéro Homme photographed by Camilla Akrans
May 2007: Out editorial photographed by François Rousseau
Fall 2007: GQ Style photographed by Aldo Rossi
Fall 2007: VMAN magazine photographed by Hedi Slimane
Spring 2008: VMAN Magazine feature
Spring 2008: Very Elle with Leelee Sobieski photographed by Doug Inglish

Death 

Olsen died on April 22, 2010, at the age of 24. He was discovered hanged, in his apartment in New York City. According to police reports, it was a suicide.

References

External links
SocialiteLife Picture gallery

1984 births
2010 suicides
Male models from Alaska
People from Homer, Alaska
Suicides by hanging in New York City
2010 deaths

Funeral celebrated on April 30, 2010 at the baptist of Dukeertown Fort Edward (State of New York - USA). Necrology 
https://www.kilmerfuneralhome.com/memorials/ambrose-olson/459119/
Burial place unknown.